CS Universitatea Știința București, commonly known as Știința București, is a women's handball team based in Bucharest, Romania that competes in the Divizia A. In 1961, they became the first team to win the European Champions Cup.

Kits

Honours

Domestic competitions 
 Liga Națională
 Winners: 1960, 1965, 1971 
 Second place: 1962, 1968, 1969, 1970, 1972 
 Third place: 1961, 1964, 1967, 1973

European competitions
 European Champions Cup:
 Winners: 1961
 Third place: 1962, 1972

Former players
  Irina Klimovschi
  Iozefina Ștefănescu
  Aurelia Szőke-Tudor
  Aurora Leonte
  Carolina Cârligeanu
  Cornelia Constantinescu
  Elisabeta Ionescu
  Simona Arghir-Sandu
  Doina Furcoi
  Lucreția Anca Moise

Former coaches
  Constantin Popescu Pilică
  Gabriel Zugrăvescu
  Elena Jianu
  Ion Bota

See also
 CSM București
 Rapid București

References

External links
  

 

Romanian handball clubs
Handball clubs established in 1949
1949 establishments in Romania
Sport in Bucharest